When the Smoke Clears is an EP by the American hardcore punk band Sick of It All. It was released on 4 November 2016 by Century Media Records on both 10" vinyl and CD. Each album also includes a coffee table book. The album celebrates the 30 year anniversary of the band.

Track listing 
 "When the Smoke Clears" – 1:56
 "Black Venom" – 2:24
 "Doomed Campaign" – 2:14
 "Blood & Steel" – 2:11
 "Fortress" – 2:39

Performers 
 Lou Koller – vocals
 Pete Koller – guitar
 Armand Majidi – drums
 Craig Setari – bass

References 

2016 EPs
Sick of It All albums
Century Media Records EPs